The MacCullagh ellipsoid is defined by the equation:

The construction of such ellipsoid was conceived by James MacCullagh.

See also 
 Dzhanibekov effect
 Poinsot's ellipsoid

References

Rigid bodies